Paya Besar serves as the state assembly district and the Parliament Constituency of Padang Serai, Kedah. It is also well known as Kulim Little India.

School 

The local schools are Smk Paya Besar,Sk Paya Besar and SJKT KoSarangapany

Temples and churches 
Dhyana Ashram
Arulmigu Annai Karumariamman Temple

References

Kulim District
Populated places in Kedah
Little Indias